Hunthausen Hall is a building on the Seattle University campus, in the U.S. state of Washington.

The building was named after Rev. Raymond G. Hunthausen in 2004, and has housed the School of Theology and Ministry.

References

External links

 

Buildings and structures in Seattle
Seattle University campus